Təzəkənd (also, Tazakend) is a village and municipality in the Davachi Rayon of Azerbaijan. The municipality consists of the villages of Təzəkənd, Qaraçaylı, Udullu, and Xırdaoymaq.

References 

Populated places in Shabran District